This is a list of cover versions by notable music artists who have recorded one or more songs written and recorded by American singer, songwriter and dancer Michael Jackson. Many notable artists began covering his songs since his debut in the early 1970s. These covers are in several different languages and genres, and some have received positive reviews from music critics and featured on record charts. Artists who have covered songs from The Jackson 5 career are not included.

See also
 :Category:Michael Jackson tribute albums

References

External links 

Cover versions of songs
Jackson, Michael